Ernst Zinner (2 February 1886 in Goldberg, Silesia – 30 August 1970) was a German astronomer and noted historian of astronomy. After studies in Munich and Jena he obtained his PhD in 1907 at the University of Jena, followed by stays at the University of Lund, the University of Paris, and the Königstuhl Observatory in Heidelberg. From 1 February 1910, Zinner worked as an assistant at Remeis Observatory, Bamberg. Here, on 23 October 1913 he rediscovered the Comet Giacobini-Zinner, which had been previously discovered by Michel Giacobini in 1900. His main work during this time was on variable stars. After working as a meteorologist during World War I, Zinner returned to Bamberg, but then moved to Munich to work in geodesy. In 1924 Zinner received the professor's title from the University of Munich. He was appointed director of Remeis-Observatory in Bamberg, Germany, in 1926 and retired in 1956. During this time his main astronomical work centered on stellar astronomy. His main speciality and interest, however, was Renaissance Astronomy and the history of astronomical instruments, an area in which he started working in 1925. 

In 1943, during the World War II, Zinner published the book Entstehung und Ausbreitung der coppernicanischen Lehre on the genesis and diffusion of the Copernican theory. 

His obituaries quote a total of 9000 printed pages on this subject, with the most significant ones focusing on biographies and cataloguing early astronomical works and instruments. He systematically exaggerated German contributions to the history of science (Westman, Robert S. 1997. “Zinner, Copernicus, and the Nazis”. Journal for the History of Astronomy 28:259–270.).

Works
 Zinner, Ernst : "Leben und Wirken des Joh. Müller von Königsberg, genannt Regiomontanus";  Translated into English by Ezra A. Brown as "Regiomontanus: His Life and Work"

Honors
 The crater Zinner on the Moon is named after him.
 Honorary doctorate of the University of Frankfurt
 Honorary citizen of Königsberg in Franken
 Leibniz Medal of the Prussian Academy of Sciences

Sources
 Ernst Zinner (1886-1970), Astronomische Nachrichten 293, 79
 Ernst Zinner (1886-1970), Journal for the History of Astronomy 2, 132

1886 births
1970 deaths
People from Złotoryja
20th-century German astronomers
Historians of astronomy
University of Jena alumni
Academic staff of the University of Paris
Academic staff of the Ludwig Maximilian University of Munich
Officers Crosses of the Order of Merit of the Federal Republic of Germany